Moksha names are the personal names among people of Moksha language and culture generally consist of a given name, a patronymic, and a family name.

The study of ancient Moksha personal names is a branch of onomastics, the study of names, and more specifically of anthroponomastics, the study of names of persons. There are hundreds of Moksha names on record, making them an important resource for any general study of naming, as well as for the study of Moksha culture itself.  The names are found in place names analyzed by experts and evaluated by archaeological findings, epic tales, clan names and modern family names.  This article will concentrate on Moksha naming from the 2–5th centuries AD, when the evidence begins, to the end of the 19th century AD.

History

Ancient History 

Ancient Mokshas generally had a single name, often qualified with a patronymic, a clan or tribe, or a place of origin. Married women were identified by the name of their husbands, not their fathers.

Hereditary family names or surnames began to be used by elites in the Khazar, Bolgharian or Muscovy service. Well into the 9th century, they were rare. But by the 11th and 12th centuries, elite families often used family names.

During the Russian period, surnames with Russian suffixes such as "-ov", "-yev","-(k)in", "-(o)vich" became common, first among Tambov, Tula, Penza and Siberian Mokshas. It is not clear when stable family surnames became widely used. Though elite families often had stable family names, many of the "last names" used by Mokshas into the 19th century were either patronymics or nicknames. It is also possible that family names were simply not recorded because Russian administrative practice preferred patronymics, and did not require surnames.

In the 19th century, patronymic surnames became common but still few family names still reflected archaic clan names.

For personal names, from the first century CE until the nineteenth century CE, pagan names from the past were partially replaced by names from Judaic scriptures and tradition. During the Russian Colonisation names of Jewish origin still were popular since they now became Biblical.

Family names may be patronymic in origin or else based on occupation, location, or personal characteristic. These origins are often indicated by roots or suffixes. Traditionally a woman used a feminine version of her father's family name, replacing it with a feminine version of her husband's name with suffix – (o/a)räsj (<) and in documents husband's family name on marriage. In modern time, a woman keeps her father's family name for life until marriage then husband's family name is used.

In official documents in modern Russia, people are given three names: a given name, a patronymic and a family name.

Given names
Until the late 19th century, many Judaic Mokshas had names from the Torah and later Old and New Testaments. Names from antiquity became less popular.

Male names usually end in -a/-ä, -ai/ei, -u/-iu but sometimes archaic forms in -man, -mas, -for, -as/es/is, -ash/esh/ish are also used. Female names almost always end in -a/ä- and -u/iu, though a few end in -ai with -l, -gä or  being possible.

Since ancient times, there has been a strong tradition of naming the first and second sons after the paternal and maternal grandfathers and the first and second daughters after the paternal and maternal grandmothers.

This results in a continuation of names in the family line, but cousins with the same official name are almost always called by different shortened forms or diminutives. The Pagan and Christian  have been divided into two lists in Moksha Wikipedia, showing the widespread use of shortened forms in addition to the rarely used formal forms of the official Russian name forms. These lists are understandable even if one doesn't understand Moksha. These variants make it possible to differentiate between cousins despite these traditionally having the same official names because they are traditionally named after their grandparents.

Family names 

Moksha family names are most commonly patronymics but may also be based on occupation, personal characteristics or clan name (Yarman Päta, Pekaren Yaku, Kavalon Serga,  Uzer Pavol .

Russian surnames 
People in speaking use the family name followed by the given name, so Osä Cherapon is called Cherapon Osä. In modern practice he is called Russian name Iosif Cherapkin, where Iosif is the Russian form of the formal Joseph and Cherapkin is possessive form from Moksha name Cherapa . The Russian feminine version is usually the genitive of the family name of the woman's father or husband; so, for example, Mr. Shukshin and Mrs. Shukshina.
Children usually receive the paternal surname.
In official documents, the father's name in the genitive will be inserted between a person's first and last names. For example, if Uchaen Roman has a daughter named Mariu and a son named Andiu, they will be referred to as María Románovna Ucháeva and Andréy Románovich  Ucháev. If Mariu then marries Yaku Tumaen, she may retain her original name or choose to be called María Románovna Tumáeva.

Footnotes

Examples of given names

Archaic names 

Afkiman, m Афкиман  founder of Afkiman 
Aguta, f Агута 
Akshmakai, f  Акшмакай 
Alai Алай, m 
Alda, f Алда 
Aldal, m Алдал , founder of Aldal
Aliona, f Алёна  Elena
Anai, m Анай , founder of Anayu
Arista, m Ариста ( 
Armai, m Армай , founder of Armei velä 
Arshu, f Арьшу  Irina
Artiush, m Артюш  Ártamis
Aryu, f Арю  Erekan 
Atämas,m Атямаз  Atämaz
Ater, m Атерь , founder of Ater
Atiash, m Атяш  founder of Atiash
Atman, m Атман  founder of Atmanka
Azrapa, m Азрапа 
Bala m Бала 
Burmiza, f Бурмиза 
Dariush/Darshu, f Дарюш/Дарьшу  
Donisi, m Дониси  Dionysus, God protector of cattle
Dora, f Дора 
Ekamas, m Екамас  Darya Ekamasova, actress of Moksha descent
Fäka, f Фяка  Thekla
Garas, m Гарась  Gerásimos
Istarta, f Истарта 
Kanor, m Канор  Nicanor
Kelgä, m Кельге  
Kidai, m Кидай , Earth God
Kinyaka, m Киняка 
Kirdyapa, m Кирдяпа    Vasily Kirdyapa 
Kitai, m Китай 
Kitsiat, m Кицят 
Klema, m Клема  Clymenus
Kola , Nikolaos
Kolapa, m Колапа  founder of Kolapa
Kolamas, m Коламаз   founder of Mokshen Kolamas
Ksniaka, f Ксняка 
Kulisha, f Кулиша 
Kulyaga, f Куляга 
Kulyas, m Куляс 
Kutsäi, m Куцяй 
Lesnifor m Леснифор  
Lipifor m Липифор  
Lituva, f Литува  Leto 
Malemas, m Малемас 
Maska, m Маска  founder of Mokshen Maskanä, Oleg Maskaev boxer of Moksha descent
Miyanza, m Миянза , 
Murai, m Мурай , founder of Murai velä
Nasta/Nastyu, f Наста/Настю , Anastasía
Mikefor, m *Микефор , Nikephoros
Normal, f Нормаль  
Oi(ka), m Ой(ка) 
Oku, m Оку 
Ot, m От 
Osta, m Оста 
Otsiat, m Оцят  founder of Otsyadu
Paranza, m Паранза  
Polyap, m Поляп  Philip  
Polda, m Полда , founder of Boldu 
Poldia, m Польдя , founder of Poldiaz
Poshapa/Poshat,m Пошапа/Пошат , founder of Poshadu velä
Pozai, m Позай  
Puresh, m Пуреш  , Kanazor of Moxel
Saitsä, m Сайце 
Salkai, m Салкай 
Samila m Самила 
Samka m Самка 
Sandor, m Сандор  Alexander
Sandra, f Сандра  Alexándra
Sazan, m Сазан  Sozon, founder of Od Sazan
Selik, m Селик , founder of Seliksa 
Shongor, f  , f rune singer from Vechkänä
Sofa, f Софа , Sofia
Syumerjgä, f Сюмерьге 
Tetingei, m Тетингей  founder of Tetingei 
Tsiftomas, m Цифтомас 
Tolku, m Толку , founder of Od Tolku
Tiushtia, m  Тюштя 
Uskai, m Ускай 
Valgapa, m Валгапа 
Vasalgä/Vasonä, f Васальге/Васоня  Basílissa
Vechkan/Vechkinza, m Вечкан/Вечкинза  founder of Vechkänä
Veka, m Века  
Velmai, m Вельмай  
Virias, m Виряс  
Yan/Yanka, m Янь/Янька  Iánthē
Yana,f Яна 
Yavsei, m Явсей  Eusébios
Yefima, m Ефима  Efthýmios
Yermila, m Ермила  Hermólāos
Yon, m Йон  , Ion
Zinä, m Зине

Footnotes

Hebrew and biblical names 

Abra, m Абра , Abraham 
Adam, m Адам  
Aksä, f Акся , Xenia
Älgä, m Эльгя , Elijah
Andiu/Andiama, m Андю/Андяма 
Aniu, f Аню , Anna
Arina, f Арина , Irene
Aron, m , Aaron
Dania, m , Daniel
Daud, m Дауд , David, founder of Daud vele
Doma(sha), f Дома(ша) , Domna
Dora/Dorka Дора/Дорка , Dora
Fadei, m Фадей , Thaddeus
Foka, m Фока , Phōkâs
Foma, m Фома , Thomas
Gavdai, m Гавдай 
Iga, m , Ignátios
Inä Ине , Eugenia
Kandra, m Кандра , Codratus
Kanor, m Канор  Nicanor
Katernä/Katrä, f Катерня/Катря , Katherine
Kavrä, m Кавре , Gabriel
Klema, m Клема , Clement
Kola, m Кола , Nicolas
Kotya, m Котя , Nicodemus
Krila, m Крила , Cyril
Lasei, m *Ласи  Blaise
Lazur, m Лазур , Lazarus
Lepa, m Лепа 
Lisa, f Лиса , Elizabeth
Luka f Лука 
Malafei, m Малафей , Malachi
Malka Малка  
Mardei, f Мардей  
Maryu, f Марю , Mariam
Marka, m  Марка   , Mark
Marfa, f Марфа   Martha
Matfei, m Матьфей , Matthew
Mika, m Мика   Micah  
Mikla, m Микла 
Minus, m Минус 
Mihaiila, m Михайила   , Michael
Mihei, m Михей   , Micaiah  
Miketa, m Микета , Nicetas
Moka, m Мока , Mocius
Mokshai, m Мокшай  Moxius
Mordukai, m *Мордукай ,  Mordecai
Mosha, m Моша , Moses
Nadyu, f Надю 
Narchat/Naricha, f Нарчат/Нарича , Queen of Moxel
Navum, f Навум , Nahum
Osä, m Ося , Joseph
Palaga, f Палага  Pelagia
Päta, m Пята , Peter
Pavol, m Павол , Paul
Polad, m Полад  
Radu(sha), m Раду(ша) 
Rast, m Раст , Tümen Prince, founder of Rast dynasty
Riba, m Риба 
Rizai, m Ризай 
Rusä, m Руся 
Saiiä, m Сайя , Isaiah
Sakai, m Сакай , Isaac, founder of Sakayevo  
Salonä, f Салоня , Salome
Sara(i), m Сара(й) 
Sekla, f Секла 
Semyä, m Семъя , Simeon
Serga, m Серьга , Serge
Sila, m Сила , Sila
Siuriandiei, m Сюряндей 
Sofa, f Софа , Sofia
Soltan, m Солтан , Earth God 
Tair, m Таир  , Taher 
Tama,f Тама  , Tamara
Trafa, m Трафа , Trophimus
Ulita, f Улита 
Vara, f , Barbara
Vasil, m Василь 
Vera, f Вера , Vera
Yäfrim, m Яфрим , Ephraim
Yagor, m Ягор , George
Yakim, m Яким , Joachim
Yaku, m Яку , Jacob
Yarma, m Ярма , Jeremiah
Yavsei, m Явсей , Eusebius
Yefiut, m Ефют 
Yesha, f Еша , female of Isaiah
Yon(ka), m Йон(ка) , Jonah 
Yosha, m Йоша , Joshua
Yuda, m Йуда , Judah
Yuha, m Юха , John
Yuvan, m Юван, Evan
Zafar, m Зафар , Zechariah

Footnotes

Gothic names 

Nava, m Нава , Noah 
Stiratӓ, m Стырятя  
Yevga, f Евга , Eve

Footnotes

Muslim names 

Ahmad, m m Ахмад , Emir of Volga Bulgaria 
Araslan 
Bazan, m Базан  
Beibars, m Бейбарс Prince from Rast Dynasty
Biliar
Islam
Jaulat, f Джаулат 
Kasim
Kulaa, m Кулаа Prince from Rast Dynasty
Mamai
Mumin, m Мумин 
Yanbars, m Янбарс Prince from Rast Dynasty

Footnotes

Examples of family names

Common suffixes

See also
Onomastics
Mokshas

References

Sources

External links 
Paasonens Mordwinisches Wörterbuch, a Major Project of Helsinki University, Mordvinic Languages Dialectal Dictionary including a great number of personal Moksha and Erzya names at least to 5th century.
Mordvinic names used by speakers of Erzya and Moksha languages
Lexicon of Mordvinic Personal Names, Republic of Mordovia Historical and ethnographic website. In Russian
Traditional Moksha Male Names. In Russian
Moksha Mordvins in Russia

Further reading 

Volga Finns
Finnic peoples
Moksha language
Indigenous peoples of Europe
Ethnic groups in Russia